Carlens Arcus (born 28 June 1996) is a Haitian professional footballer who plays as a right-back for Eredivisie club Vitesse and the Haiti national team.

Club career
When Arcus was about 15–16 years of age, he travelled to São Paulo, Brazil, and played for a Série D club, where he learned Portuguese. In 2014, he returned to Haiti and played for top-tier Racing Club Haïtien and then for Club Sportif Saint-Louis of the second division.

Arcus played for Troyes in Ligue 1 in 2015, until signing with Lille in 2016.

On 23 June 2022, Arcus signed a three-year contract with Vitesse in the Netherlands.

Career statistics

Club

International goals
Scores and results list Haiti's goal tally first, score column indicates score after each Arcus goal.

References

External links

1996 births
Living people
Sportspeople from Port-au-Prince
Association football fullbacks
Haitian footballers
Lille OSC players
Cercle Brugge K.S.V. players
AJ Auxerre players
SBV Vitesse players
Ligue Haïtienne players
Ligue 1 players
Ligue 2 players
Championnat National 2 players
Championnat National 3 players
Haiti international footballers
2019 CONCACAF Gold Cup players
2021 CONCACAF Gold Cup players
Expatriate footballers in France
Expatriate footballers in Belgium
Expatriate footballers in the Netherlands
Haitian expatriate sportspeople in France
Haitian expatriate sportspeople in Belgium
Haitian expatriate sportspeople in the Netherlands